Péter Kun (October 29, 1967 – July 10, 1993) was a Hungarian hard rock guitarist. He played for rock bands such as Pokolgép and Edda művek. He died in a motorcycle accident in 1993; he was 26 years old. He is regarded as one of the most accomplished young guitarists of his time.

He has a daughter, Petra Kun.

Bands
 1984–88: Triton (Százhalombatta)
 1988–89: Magazin (Százhalombatta)* 1989–90: Sing Sing (Százhalombatta)
 1990: Kenguru (Százhalombatta)
 1990: Új Triton (Százhalombatta)
 1990–91: Pokolgép (Budapest)
 1991–93: Edda művek (Budapest)

External links
 All dead, all dead... list by metalbandi @ RYM

20th-century Hungarian musicians
1967 births
1993 deaths
20th-century guitarists
Hungarian rock guitarists
Male guitarists
Motorcycle road incident deaths
Road incident deaths in Hungary
Hungarian male musicians